Sabussowia is a genus of flatworms belonging to the family Cercyridae.

The species of this genus are found in Europe and Northern America.

Species:
Sabussowia dioica 
Sabussowia ronaldi 
Sabussowia wilhelmii

References

Platyhelminthes